Kircheib is a municipality in the district of Altenkirchen, in Rhineland-Palatinate, in western Germany. In 1796, the Battle of Kircheib was fought near the village between France and Austria as part of the War of the First Coalition.

References

Altenkirchen (district)